Asrani is a common surname among Sindhi Hindus. Like other Sindhi Hindus, Asrani's migrated to India, when Sindh was given to Pakistan in the Partition of India. Many of them migrated to other countries like the United States, United Kingdom, etc. A majority of Asranis are in Mumbai, Maharashtra and California, United States.

Asranis are Hindus.

Most of the Sindhi Surnames end with either '-ja' or -'-ani'.

-ani in the surname refers to clan, or name of their forefathers. For example, People having Mulchandani Surname, Here Mulchand is the name of their ancestor.

Similarly, ASRANI is derived from Asromal (Name of their ancestor).

Asrani Surname means "Hope" (as "Asro" / "Asra" - Means "Hope" in Sindhi Language)

The original inhabitants of ancient Sindh were believed to be aboriginal tribes speaking languages of the Indus Valley Civilization around 3300 BC. Moen-jo-Daro is the symbol of Indus Valley Civilization in World.

Asrani  is the name of:

 Asrani, Govardhan Asrani, popular Bollywood actor
 Apurva Asrani, filmmaker based in Mumbai, Maharashtra, India
 Naveen Asrani, former cricketer who played for Tripura
 Roma Asrani, Indian actress

mr:असराणी